Tariq is an Arabic given name.

Tariq or Tarik may also refer to:

 Tarik (album) a 1969 album by American jazz saxophonist Dewey Redman
 Tarik, a district in Sidoarjo Regency, Indonesia
 Tariq (singer), Sri Lankan composer and singer
 Tariq area, Greater Amman Municipality, Jordan
 Tariq-class destroyer, a class of guided missile destroyer warships of the British Royal Navy
 Tariqa, a Sufi order and its way of life 
 At-Tariq, a sura of the Qur'an
 Egyptian sloop Tariq
 Jabal Tariq, or Rock of Gibraltar
 Pepsi Tarik, a soft drink that combines the taste of coffee and Pepsi cola
 Teh tarik, a type of tea served in Malaysia
 Toronto and Region Islamic Congregation (TARIC), an Islamic Center commonly in Toronto, Ontario, Canada

See also
 
 
 TARIC code, the harmonised Taric code used in importing goods into the European Union